The Freedom of Internet Act (formerly Free Internet Act) is an act aimed to legislate the Internet and its uses worldwide, as an alternative to SOPA and PIPA. The idea was originated in a Reddit post  and the act is being developed in a subsection of Reddit specifically created for this purpose. As one of the first instances of crowd sourcing legislation, it has raised questions concerning public participation in government in the 21st century. The act passed January 12, 2012.

Early articles by blog site Techdirt and technology news site Techspot show that there is an interest to see how this proposal will pan out in the wake of the successful Reddit campaign to halt the passage of SOPA and PIPA. Some technology journalists wrote tongue-in-cheek commentaries on the situation. Covered by RT, Alexis Ohanian, Co-founder of Reddit, explained that

<blockquote>This is definitely a first, but I'll tell you we are in uncharted territory. This is a community that a few years ago decided it was going to be a good idea to have the world's largest secret santa exchange, and did it.  And entire websites have been devoted to this, and now twice a year you can exchange secret santa gifts with people all across the world. It just kind of works.  And it's this decentralized magic, that has done so much for the SOPA and PIPA fight thus far, yeah I wouldn't put anything past them.  Now there is still a long way to go from great discussions online to actual legislation, but what's really excited is that what's come out of the backlash is that there are legislators, there are senators and representatives who are actually listening.</p></blockquote>

Points of Discussion
In preparation for drafting of the proposed legislation, the community of individuals involved have created threads of discussion and debate dedicated to answering the broad questions associated with legislation of this kind.  The topics include:

Privacy

Article VII Section B of the Act states that “Everything a user does with their computer is considered private.” Any actions a user takes to protect their privacy, such as using proxies, cannot be assumed to be used for illegal actions. The Act classifies the following as private data: all data that can personally identify the owner, harm the owner in any way, data that has not been explicitly agreed to be public, and all encrypted data is considered to be private. Additionally, data collected for judicial proceedings must be able to be used as evidence. According to the act: “Any data absorbed during the search for evidence must be returned to its owner within 15 business days. Any copies of data not used as evidence must be permanently deleted and removed from any kind of storage.”  However, content that a user knows is illegal to upload in a given region is not considered private data (for example, child pornography). Users who download such data and who neglect to report it are also liable for the data.

Censorship

The Act proposes that all sovereign Federal and State Governments cannot censor any kind of material on the Internet other than child pornography and financial scams, and in order to censor those topics, it must be done after they are uploaded because it would be illegal to monitor any data while it is being uploaded. Additionally, only the creator or uploader can be held responsible for illegal material, and any time material is removed, the uploader must be notified.

Free Speech

By prohibiting censorship of the internet, the FIA would carry this most basic American right on to the internet. In the most recent draft of the act, it states that the “FIA will allow internet users to browse freely without any means of censorship, users have the right to free speech and to free knowledge; we govern the content of the internet, governments don’t.”  With no legal government presiding over online content, one would be able to freely post, share, and say whatever one desired on the internet.

Copyright
Kevin Lincoln, a writer for Business Insider, argued that the Act is extremely weak in protecting copyright because under the act, content that may infringe on copyright can only be policed after it is uploaded.  Only the uploader, not the website hosting possibly illegal content, would be penalized. To prove that someone violated copyright, the accuser must prove that the uploader knew they were uploading illegal content and they did not know they were uploading it for Fair Use. The accused person must be notified 30 days before the content is taken down so they have adequate time to fight the claim. Monitoring of content being downloaded, uploaded or edited would not be allowed without legal permission, and to try to remove content without a court order would be considered against the freedom of speech and the perpetrator would be subject to legal penalty.

Criticism
Techspot published an article that questioned whether the Reddit community effort would be able to produce a successful bill.  A Business Insider article alleges that the proposed bill "is so weak in protecting copyright that it would likely revert the Internet back to a Wild West-type situation where more or less anything goes." The article concludes that the bill would make violation of copyright widespread and copyright litigation difficult due to increased burdens of proof and increased immunity for hosting.

Inside of Reddit, community members have voiced concern about both the direction of the bill and language used in it, suggesting that the use of the community contributions instead of a professional group to draft the bill will decrease the quality of the bill.

References

External links
 FIA Subreddit

Internet censorship